Mereta (also Fisherville or Lipan) is an unincorporated community in eastern Tom Green County, Texas, United States.  It lies along local roads east of the city of San Angelo, the county seat of Tom Green County.  Its elevation is 1,755 feet (535 m).  Although Mereta is unincorporated, it has a post office, with the ZIP code of 76940; the ZCTA for ZIP Code 76940 had a population of 138 at the 2000 census.

Mereta was named by the local postmaster in honor of twin sisters, named Meta and Reta, who lived in the area in 1902.  The community itself was platted in 1904.

References

External links
Profile of Mereta from the Handbook of Texas Online

Unincorporated communities in Tom Green County, Texas
Unincorporated communities in Texas